Nemanja Cvetković may refer to:
 Nemanja Cvetković (footballer, born 1980)
 Nemanja Cvetković (footballer, born 1996)